The chemical abbreviation 1,3-DCP may stand for:

 1,3-Dichloropropan-2-ol
 1,3-Dichloropropane
 1,3-Dichloropropene